Spicauda simplicius, the plain longtail, is a species of butterfly in the family Hesperiidae. It is found from Argentina, north through Central America, Mexico, and the West Indies to southern Texas and peninsular Florida.

References

External links
Urbanus simplicius, Neotropical Butterflies

Eudaminae
Butterflies of North America
Butterflies of Central America
Hesperiidae of South America
Lepidoptera of Brazil
Lepidoptera of Colombia
Lepidoptera of Ecuador
Lepidoptera of Venezuela
Fauna of the Amazon
Butterflies described in 1790